Togay , pronounced (Toe-guy), is a Turkish male given name and surname meaning "full moon" or "rising moon". Notable people with the name include:

Surname:

Can Togay, Hungarian film director
Erol Togay, Turkish footballer
Nuri Togay, 16th President of Beşiktaş J.K.

Given Name:

Togay Bey, Crimean Tatar military leader
Togay-Timur, grandson of Genghis Khan
Kara Şaman Togay, Mongolian Warlord from Kuruluş: Osman

See also
Tuğay
Tugay

References

Turkish-language surnames